The sixth term of the Government of the Republic of Poland is the term of the Government that ran from 5 November 2007 to 7 November 2011.

Elections were held on 21 October 2007 to the Sejm, with all 460 members being elected.

18 members of this term were killed in office in the Smolensk air disaster.

Officers

Members of Sejm

See also 
 2007 Polish parliamentary election
 List of Polish senators (2007–2011)
 List of Sejm members (2005–2007) – former term

References